Huilacollo (possibly from Aymara wila blood, blood-red, qullu mountain, "red mountain") is a mountain in the Andes of southern Peru which reaches a height of approximately . It is located in the Tacna Region, Candarave Province, on the border of the districts of Camilaca and Candarave. Huilacollo lies southwest of the Tutupaca volcano and east of Sallajaque.

References

Mountains of Peru
Mountains of Tacna Region